The 2014 USA Outdoor Track and Field Championships was held at Hornet Stadium in Sacramento, California. Organised by USA Track and Field, the four-day competition took place June 26–29 in conjunction with the USA Junior Combined Events Outdoor Track & Field Championships which started the day before and served as the national championships in track and field for the United States.

Schedule

The men's and women's shot put events were contested at the California State Capitol, separate from the rest of the program held at Hornet Stadium.

Men's results

Men track events

Men field events

Notes
 Nick Ross and Dustin Jonas tied on misses at 2.25m & 2.28m.

Women's results

Women track events

Women field events

Notes
 Inika McPherson was later disqualified after testing positive for cocaine use. 
 Becky Holliday earned 3rd over Kaitlin Petrillose one fewer miss at 4.45 meters.
 Ciarra Brewer earned 2nd place on the tiebreak rule of the 2nd furthest jump over Lynnika Pitts.

References

Results
Complete Results 2014 USA Track & Field Championships - 6/25/2014 to 6/29/2014 Hornet Stadium - Sacramento, California. USATF. Retrieved on 2015-07-05.

Daily reports
Wilson wins 800m, Henderson and McPherson fly at US Championships. IAAF (2014-06-30). Retrieved on 2014-06-30.
McCorory holds off resurgent Richards-Ross to win US 400m title. IAAF (2014-06-29). Retrieved on 2014-06-30.
World leads from Hardee and Richards-Ross as Lagat wins seventh US title. IAAF (2014-06-28). Retrieved on 2014-06-30.
Rupp and Conley take 10,000m titles at US Championships. IAAF (2014-06-27). Retrieved on 2014-06-30.
Mulkeen, Jon (2014-06-26). US Championships kicks off with world-leading 22.03m in shot put from Kovacs. IAAF. Retrieved on 2014-06-30.

USA Outdoor Track and Field Championships
USA Outdoors
Track, Outdoor
USA Outdoor Track and Field Championships
Track and field in California
USA Outdoor Track and Field Championships